The 1938–39 Panhellenic Championship was the tenth season of the highest football league of Greece. 14 teams participated, for the first time so many and for the first time from the province. It was held in two groups, Southern Group with 8 and Northern Group with 6 teams, which qualified from the championships of the local associations.

The Southern Group was formed by club of Athens' and Piraeus' associations and resulted as follows:
Athenian Championship: The first 5 teams of the ranking.
Piraeus' Championship: The first 3 teams of the ranking.

The Northern Group was formed by clubs of Macedonian and Eastern Macedonian association and resulted as follows:
Macedonian Championship: The first 3 teams of the ranking.
Eastern Macedonian Championship: The first 3 teams of the ranking.

It was the first time that teams outside Central Greece and Thessaloniki participated in the national championship. The champions of the two groups, AEK Athens (due to a better goal ratio than Olympiacos) and Iraklis, competed in a 2 legged final for the title of champion. AEK Athens won the championship, who were qualified for the national championship as the runner-up of Αthenian championship, with their then rising star, Kleanthis Maropoulos.

In order to complete the championship, since 26 matchdays were required, it was decided that the teams that qualified for the national championship will not compete again but will transfer each other results of local championships. From this period, the HFF established a point system of 3-2-1 in all competitions, so that there was the ability of zeroing any team that refused to take part in a match. This system was valid until the 1972–73 season.

Qualification round

Athens Football Clubs Association

 a. The ranking and the points are the final but the reported goal difference is of the penultimate (9th) matchday.

Piraeus Football Clubs Association

Macedonia Football Clubs Association

Semi-final Round

Southern Group

 a. Atromitos has -2 points.

Northern Group

Finals

|+Summary

|}

Matches

AEK Athens won 7–3 on aggregate.

Top scorers

References

External links
Rsssf, 1938–39 championship

 

Panhellenic Championship seasons
Greece
1938–39 in Greek football